Weddle is a surname. Notable people with the surname include:

 Chris Weddle (born 1983), bodhrán player and instructor
 David Weddle, American television producer and writer
 Eric Weddle (born 1985), American football player
 Jack Weddle (1905–1979), English footballer
 James D. Weddle, American businessman
 Mary Weddle (born 1934), All-American Girls Professional Baseball League player
 Mat Weddle or Obadiah Parker (born 1983), American singer-songwriter
 Thomas Weddle (1817–1853) English mathematician
 Vernon Weddle (born 1935), American film, stage and television actor

See also
 Weddell (disambiguation), which includes a list of people with the surname